Zuiyo (瑞鷹株式会社 ZUIYO Co., Ltd., or: ズイヨー Zuiyō) is a Japanese animation company founded in 1969 and headquartered in Tokyo.

The studio has produced in the past a variety of series based on Western literature such as Moomin, Heidi, Girl of the Alps and Vicky the Viking.

History

Zuiyo Enterprise and Zuiyo Eizo (1969-1975) 
The company was founded as Zuiyo Enterprise (瑞鷹エンタープライズ Zuiyō Entāpuraizu) in April 1969, by TCJ former manager Shigeto Takahashi. The company was involved in the production of animated series for the TV anime staple Calpis Comic Theater (Karupisu manga gekijō), later known as World Masterpiece Theater, broadcast on Fuji TV. These series were based on children's literature such as Moomin and Andersen Stories. These earlier series' animation were commissioned to two other studios: Mushi Production and Tokyo Movie Shinsha, while Zuiyo was mainly involved in the planning.

Between 1972 and 1973, Zuiyo Enterprise changed its name to Zuiyo Eizo (ズイヨー映像 Zuiyō Eizō) after changing headquarter. However, the studio will continue to be credited as Zuiyo Enterprise in some foreign versions of its works. In this time Zuiyo was working on its first independent production based on Johanna Spyri's Heidi, an ambitious project on which Isao Takahata and Hayao Miyazaki also worked on. In 1967 Takahashi had already produced a short pilot for a Heidi series with TCJ, but the project was shelved. In the meantime Zuiyo also worked on Vicky the Viking, a German co-production with ZDF and ORF, based on Runer Jonsson's eponymous book series. In 1974 Heidi, Girl of the Alps and Vicky the Viking were broadcast in Japan, soon gaining a huge success also in Europe. Nevertheless, Zuiyo Eizo found itself in financial difficulties due to the high production costs of its series, not enough repaid by the selling of its properties to European market. In 1975, Zuiyo Eizo was split into two entities: Zuiyo Co., Ltd., which absorbed the debt and the rights to the Heidi anime and other previous series, and Nippon Animation, which was essentially Zuiyo Eizo's production staff (including Miyazaki and Takahata), which would continue to produce World Masterpiece Theater, retaining the rights of other series on which the studio was working on, such as A Dog of Flanders and Maya the Honey Bee.

Zuiyo 
From here on, Zuiyo mainly dealt with the distribution and marketing of its previous creations, co-producing only occasionally new anime.

Between 1979 and 1983 the studio temporarily returned to be named Zuiyo Enterprise. In 1979, the studio produced a theatrical re-edited footage film based on Heidi, Girl of the Alps. Between the 80s and the early 90s, Zuiyo produced in collaboration with other studios some animated series such as Serendipity the Pink Dragon (1983), Elves of the Forest (1984–85), Fairy Dick (1992) and the OAV Fox Wood Tales (1991–92).

In the 2000s, the studio was involved in the production of experimental CGI animated series and short films such as Popee the Performer, RAHMAN and Elec-king The Animation.

Between 2010 and 2017, Zuiyo also produced a series of parody shorts in which Heidi's characters appear in a comedic-zany way: Tei nenpi shōjo Haiji (2010), 13 streaming commercials promoting a new model of Nissan Note, and Arupusu no Shōjo Haiji? Chara Onji (2016) and Arupusu no Shōjo Haiji? Chara Onji Z (2017) a series of short films starring Heidi's grandfather.

Select works

TV Series 

 The Chronicles of Kamui the Ninja (忍風カムイ外伝 , Ninpū Kamui Gaiden) – 1969 (co-produced with TCJ)
 Moomin (ムーミン, Mūmin) – 1969-70 (co-produced with Tokyo Movie Shinsha and Mushi Production)
 Andersen Stories (アンデルセン物語, Anderusen Monogatari) – 1971 (co-produced with Mushi Production)
 New Moomin (新 ムーミン, Shin Moomin) – 1972 (co-produced with Mushi Production)
 Little Wansa (ワンサくん, Wansa-kun) – 1973 (co-produced with Mushi Production)
 Fables of the Green Forest (山ねずみロッキーチャック, Yama Nezumi Rokkī Chakku) – 1973 (co-produced with Mushi Production)
 Heidi, Girl of the Alps (アルプスの少女ハイジ, Arupusu no Shōjo Haiji) – 1974
 Vicky the Viking (小さなバイキング ビッケ, Chiisana Viking Vikke) – 1974-75 (co-produced with ZDF, ORF, Taurus Film, Mushi Production (eps. 1–26) and completed by Nippon Animation (eps. 53-78))
 A Dog of Flanders (フランダースの犬, Furandāsu no Inu) – 1975 (eps. 1-20, 24–26, property of Nippon Animation)
 Maya the Honey Bee (みつばちマーヤの冒険, Mitsubachi Māya no Bōken) – 1975-76 (eps. 1–6, property of Nippon Animation)
 Serendipity the Pink Dragon (ピュア島の仲間たち, Pyuatō no Nakama-tachi) – 1983 (co-produced with Dragon Production, SHAFT, Studio Unicorn and Tama Production)
 Elves of the Forest (森のトントたち, Mori no Tonto Tachi) – 1984-85 (co-produced with SHAFT)
 Fairy Dick (妖精ディック, Yōsei Dikku) – 1992 (co-produced with Grouper Productions, Marubeni)

OAV 

 Fox Wood Tales (フォックスウッドものがたり, Fokkus uuddo monogatari) – 1991-92 (co-produced with Grouper Productions, Marubeni and Nippon Columbia)

Film 

 Arupusu no Shōjo Haiji (アルプスの少女ハイジ) – 1979

Commercial 

 Tei nenpi shōjo Haiji (低燃費少女ハイジ) – 2010 (co-produced with Studio Crocodile)

References

External links 

 Official site
 Zuiyo Enterprise, at  Anime News Network's encyclopedia
 Zuiyo Eizo, at Anime News Network's encyclopedia
 Zuiyo, at Anime News Network's encyclopedia
 Zuiyo, at IMDb

Animation studios in Tokyo
Mass media companies established in 1969
Japanese companies established in 1969
Japanese animation studios
Companies of Japan